John Wood Blodgett Sr. was a lumberman, civic leader, and philanthropist. He was born on a frontier farm where the present village of Hersey, Michigan, now sits, to logging and sawmill operation owner Delos A. and Jane Wood Blodgett.

Education
John's father built a school for the settlement where he received his early education, then attended Todd Seminary, Woodstock, IL, and Military Academy in Worcester, MA, graduating in 1876.  Expecting college, his father's illness directed John into the family's pine-logging and milling interests, quickly learning the trade.

National Lumber Manufacturers Association
Blodgett was president of the National Lumber Manufacturers Association in 1922, 1923, and 1930. He was the first chairman of the American Lumber Standard Committee when it was created in 1922.

Blodgett family archive
According to the Finding aid for Blodgett Family papers, 1872–1953 abstract at Bentley Historical Library within the University of Michigan Digital Library, the family archive contains :

Blodgett's consolidation of three banks during the depression protected many of his clients' homes and account balances.  The product of that consolidation was the American Home Security Bank.  He and his wife, Minnie, were quite the philanthropists, noted for the Blodgett Memorial Hospital, the Clinic for Infant Feeding, Vassar College's Minnie Cumnock Blodgett Hall of Euthenics, The Association for the Blind, among many others.

References

Further reading
 Jeffrey Sytsma, "Health Care Pioneers: The Blodgett Family." Michigan History, Jan/Feb 2020, pp. 33–38. Lansing, Michigan: Historical Society of Michigan. Retrieved via Gale OneFile.

1860 births
1951 deaths
Timber industry